Champagne is a French surname. Notable people with the surname include:

 Albert Champagne (1866–1937), Canadian rancher, hotel-owner and political figure
 Andre Champagne (born 1943), Canadian ice hockey player
 Andrée Champagne (1939–2020), Canadian actress, pianist and politician
 Charles Champagne (disambiguation), multiple people
 Claude Champagne (1891–1965), Canadian composer
 Claudette Champagne, Canadian social activist
 Connie Champagne (born 1959 as Kelly Kay Brock), American singer, songwriter and actor
 David B. Champagne (1932–1952), American navy corporal and Medal of Honor recipient 
 Frances Champagne, Canadian neuroscientist
 François-Philippe Champagne (born 1970), Canadian politician
 Jean-François Champagne (1751–1813), French scholar
 Jérôme Champagne (born 1958), French diplomat 
 Keith Champagne (born 1970), American comic artist
 Kenneth Champagne, Canadian judge
 Louis Champagne, Canadian talk radio personality
 Louis Napoléon Champagne (1860–1911), Canadian lawyer, judge and politician
 Michel Champagne (born 1956), Canadian politician and businessman 
 Napoléon Champagne (1861–1925), Canadian politician 
 Nereo Champagne (born 1985), Argentine football goalkeeper
 Noëlla Champagne (born 1944), Canadian politician 
 Peter B. Champagne (1845–1891), American politician
 Ronald Champagne (born 1942), American higher education administrator
 Salvatore Champagne, American operatic tenor

See also 
 Champagne (disambiguation)

French-language surnames